The 2015 Notre Dame Fighting Irish baseball team will represent the University of Notre Dame during the 2015 NCAA Division I baseball season. The Fighting Irish will play their home games at Frank Eck Stadium as a member of the Atlantic Coast Conference. They were led by head coach Mik Aoki, in his 5th season at Notre Dame.

Previous season
In 2014, the Fighting Irish finished the season 7th in the ACC's Atlantic Division with a record of 22–31, 9–21 in conference play. They failed to qualify for the 2014 Atlantic Coast Conference baseball tournament or the 2014 NCAA Division I baseball tournament.

Personnel

Roster

Coaching staff

Schedule

! style="" | Regular Season
|- valign="top"

|- align="center" bgcolor=#bbffbb
| February 13 || vs.  ||  || L. Dale Mitchell Park • Norman, OK || 7–6 || Peter Solomon (1–0) || Brett Thomas (0–1) ||  || 1,283 || 1–0 || 
|- align="center" bgcolor=#ffbbbb
| February 13 || at Oklahoma ||  || L. Dale Mitchell Park • Norman, OK || 1–6 || Jake Elliott (1–0) || Scott Kerrigan (0–1) ||  || 1,283 || 1–1 || 
|- align="center" bgcolor=#bbffbb
| February 14 || at Oklahoma ||  || L. Dale Mitchell Park • Norman, OK || 10–9 || Brandon Bielak (1–0) || Alec Hansen (0–1) || Ryan Smoyer (1) || 1,735 || 2–1 || 
|- align="center" bgcolor=#bbffbb
| February 15 || at Oklahoma ||  || L. Dale Mitchell Park • Norman, OK || 5–1 || Nick McCarty (1–0) || Adam Choplick (0–1) || Peter Solomon (1) || 1,735 || 3–1 || 
|- align="center" bgcolor=#bbffbb
| February 19 || vs.  ||  || Nelson Wolff Stadium • San Antonio, TX || 14–1 || Michael Hearne (1–0) || Cody Richey (0–2) ||  || 335 || 4–1 || 
|- align="center" bgcolor=#bbffbb
| February 20 || vs.  ||  || Nelson Wolff Stadium • San Antonio, TX || 8–1 || Scott Kerrigan (1–1) || Mike Sgaramella (0–1) ||  || 333 || 5–1 || 
|- align="center" bgcolor=#bbffbb
| February 21 || vs.  ||  || Nelson Wolff Stadium • San Antonio, TX || 7–3 || Scott Tully (1–0) || Matt Portland (0–2) ||  || 572 || 6–1 || 
|- align="center" bgcolor=#bbffbb
| February 22 || vs. Incarnate Word ||  || Nelson Wolff Stadium • San Antonio, TX || 11–1 || Nick McCarty (2–0) || Kris Looper (0–1) ||  || 269 || 7–1 || 
|- align="center" bgcolor=#bbffbb
| February 27 || vs.  ||  || Claude Smith Field • Macon, GA || 6–4 || Scott Tully (2–0) || Aaron Quillen (1–1) || Peter Solomon (2) || 147 || 8–1 || 
|- align="center" bgcolor=#bbffbb
| February 28 || at  ||  || Claude Smith Field • Macon, GA || 8–2 || Brandon Bielak (2–0) || Connor Herd (1–1) ||  || 408 || 9–1 || 
|- align="center" bgcolor=#bbffbb
| February 28 || vs.  ||  || Claude Smith Field • Macon, GA || 5–4 || Brad Bass (1–0) || Matt LaRocca (0–1) ||  || 204 || 10–1 || 
|-

|- align="center" bgcolor=#bbffbb
| March 6 || at No. 28 Georgia Tech || No. 25 || Russ Chandler Stadium • Atlanta, GA || 3–2 (10) || Brad Bass (2–0) || Matthew Gorst (0–2) || Peter Solomon (3) || 1,108 || 11–1 || 1–0
|- align="center" bgcolor=#ffbbbb
| March 7 || at No. 28 Georgia Tech || No. 25 || Russ Chandler Stadium • Atlanta, GA || 7–11 || Zac Ryan (3–0) || Brandon Bielak (2–1) ||  || 1,821 || 11–2 || 1–1
|- align="center" bgcolor=#ffbbbb
| March 8 || at No. 28 Georgia Tech || No. 25 || Russ Chandler Stadium • Atlanta, GA || 1–4 || Brandon Gold (2–0) || Nick McCarty (2–1) ||  || 1,887 || 11–3 || 1–2
|- align="center" bgcolor=#bbffbb
| March 11 || at  || No. 27 || Tiger Field • Savannah, GA || 5–3 (11) || Peter Solomon (2–0) || Zach Chandler (0–1) || Brad Bass (1) || 210 || 12–3 || 
|- align="center" bgcolor=#ffbbbb
| March 14 || at Clemson || No. 27 || Doug Kingsmore Stadium • Clemson, SC || 1–6 || Matthew Crownover (4–0) || Scott Kerrigan (1–2) ||  || 4,961 || 12–4 || 1–3
|- align="center" bgcolor=#bbffbb
|  March 14 || at Clemson || No. 27 || Doug Kingsmore Stadium • Clemson, SC || 11–6 || Sean Guenther (1–0) || Pat Krall (0–1) || Peter Solomon (4) || 4,961 || 13–4 || 2–3
|- align="center" bgcolor=#bbffbb
| March 15 || at Clemson || No. 27 || Doug Kingsmore Stadium • Clemson, SC || 5–1 || Nick McCarty (3–1) || Zack Erwin (1–3) ||  || 4,343 || 14–4 || 3–3
|- align="center" bgcolor="#bbbbbb"
| March 17 ||  ||  || Frank Eck Stadium • Notre Dame, IN || colspan=7| Cancelled
|- align="center" bgcolor=#bbffbb
| March 18 ||  || No. 22 || Frank Eck Stadium • Notre Dame, IN || 8–3 || Ryan Smoyer (1–0) || Jordan Grosjean (0–3) ||  || 613 || 15–4 || 
|- align="center" bgcolor=#ffbbbb
| March 20 || No. 17 Louisville || No. 22 || Frank Eck Stadium • Notre Dame, IN || 0–2 || Kyle Funkhouser (2–2) || Scott Kerrigan (1–3) || Drew Harrington (3) || 572 || 15–5 || 3–4
|- align="center" bgcolor=#ffbbbb
| March 21 || No. 17 Louisville || No. 22 || Frank Eck Stadium • Notre Dame, IN || 4–6 (18) || Sean Leland (1–0) || Scott Tully (2–1) ||  || 746 || 15–6 || 3–5
|- align="center" bgcolor=#ffbbbb
| March 22 || No. 17 Louisville || No. 22 || Frank Eck Stadium • Notre Dame, IN || 0–3 || Josh Rogers (3–1) || Nick McCarty (3–2) || Drew Harrington (4) || 476 || 15–7 || 3–6
|- align="center" bgcolor=#bbffbb
| March 25 ||  ||  || Frank Eck Stadium • Notre Dame, IN || 8–3 || Ryan Smoyer (2–0) || Tanner Allison (1–5) ||  || 215 || 16–7 || 
|- align="center" bgcolor=#ffbbbb
| March 28 || No. 25 Virginia ||  || Frank Eck Stadium • Notre Dame, IN || 1–9 || Nathan Kirby (4–1) || Scott Kerrigan (1–4) || Kevin Doherty (2) || 783 || 16–8 || 3–7
|- align="center" bgcolor=#ffbbbb
| March 28 || No. 25 Virginia ||  || Frank Eck Stadium • Notre Dame, IN || 2–4 || Tommy Doyle (1–0) || Sean Guenther (1–1) || Josh Sborz (6) || 783 || 16–9 || 3–8
|- align="center" bgcolor=#ffbbbb
| March 29 || No. 25 Virginia ||  || Frank Eck Stadium • Notre Dame, IN || 4–5 || Brandon Waddell (2–1) || Nick McCarty (3–3) || Josh Sborz (7) || 377 || 16–10 || 3–9
|- align="center" bgcolor=#bbffbb
| March 31 ||  ||  || Frank Eck Stadium • Notre Dame, IN || 6–0 || Ryan Smoyer (3–0) || Adam Hornstra (0–1) ||  || 363 || 17–10 || 
|-

|- align="center" bgcolor=#bbffbb
| April 4 || at Pittsburgh ||  || Charles L. Cost Field • Pittsburgh, PA || 8–1 || Brandon Bielak (3–1) || T. J. Zeuch (2–4) ||  || 511 || 18–10 || 4–9
|- align="center" bgcolor=#bbffbb
| April 4 || at Pittsburgh ||  || Charles L. Cost Field • Pittsburgh, PA || 7–1 || Nick McCarty (4–3) || Aaron Sandefur (1–4) ||  || 511 || 19–10 || 5–9
|- align="center" bgcolor=#bbffbb
| April 5 || at Pittsburgh ||  || Charles L. Cost Field • Pittsburgh, PA || 7–3 || Ryan Smoyer (4–0) || Marc Berube (0–4) || Sean Guenther (1) || 384 || 20–10 || 6–9
|- align="center" bgcolor=#bbffbb
| April 8 ||  ||  || Frank Eck Stadium • Notre Dame, IN || 6–0 || Scott Tully (3–1) || Connor Kaucic (1–3) || || 417 || 21–10 || 
|- align="center" bgcolor=#bbffbb
| April 10 || No. 7 Florida State ||  || Frank Eck Stadium • Notre Dame, IN || 5–2 || Ryan Smoyer (5–0) || Boomer Biegalski (2–3) || Sean Guenther (2) || 522 || 22–10 || 7–9
|- align="center" bgcolor=#bbffbb
| April 11 || No. 7 Florida State ||  || Frank Eck Stadium • Notre Dame, IN || 4–1 || Brandon Bielak (4–1) || Drew Carlton (2–2) || Sean Guenther (3) || 1,109 || 23–10 || 8–9
|- align="center" bgcolor=#bbffbb
| April 12 || No. 7 Florida State ||  || Frank Eck Stadium • Notre Dame, IN || 2–1 || Connor Hale (1–0) || Mike Compton (1–1) || Scott Tully (1) || 896 || 24–10 || 9–9
|- align="center" bgcolor=#ffbbbb
| April 15 ||  || No. 25 || Frank Eck Stadium • Notre Dame, IN || 0–5 || Alex Wagner (2–3) || Scott Tully (3–2) || Kevin Kline (1) || 344 || 24–11 ||
|- align="center" bgcolor=#bbffbb
| April 17 || NC State || No. 25 || Frank Eck Stadium • Notre Dame, IN || 2–0 || Ryan Smoyer (6–0) || Cory Wilder (2–5) || Sean Guenther (4) || 555 || 25–11 || 10–9
|- align="center" bgcolor=#ffbbbb
| April 18 || NC State || No. 25 || Frank Eck Stadium • Notre Dame, IN || 2–4 (14) || Joe O'Donnell (5–2) || Evy Ruibal (0–1) || || 1,230 || 25–12 || 10–10
|- align="center" bgcolor=#bbffbb
| April 18 || NC State || No. 25 || Frank Eck Stadium • Notre Dame, IN || 7–2 || Nick McCarty (5–3) || Ryan Williamson (3–2) || || 1,230 || 26–12 || 11–10
|- align="center" bgcolor=#ffbbbb
| April 21 || vs. Indiana || No. 26 || Victory Field • Indianapolis, IN || 5–6 || Ryan Halstead (1–1) || Sean Guenther (1–2) || || 8,728 || 26–13 ||
|- align="center" bgcolor=#bbffbb
| April 22 ||  || No. 26 || Frank Eck Stadium • Notre Dame, IN || 11–0 || Connor Hale (2–0) || Ean McNeal (0–1) || || 235 || 27–13 ||
|- align="center" bgcolor=#bbffbb
| April 24 || at Wake Forest || No. 26 || Wake Forest Baseball Park • Winston-Salem, NC || 9–5 || Scott Kerrigan (2–4) || Matt Pirro (6–3) || || 1,153 || 28–13 || 12–10
|- align="center" bgcolor=#ffbbbb
| April 25 || at Wake Forest || No. 26 || Wake Forest Baseball Park • Winston-Salem, NC || 2–4 || Will Craig (2–3) || Evy Ruibal (0–2) || Parker Dunshee (3) || 608 || 28–14 || 12–11
|- align="center" bgcolor=#ffbbbb
| April 26 || at Wake Forest || No. 26 || Wake Forest Baseball Park • Winston-Salem, NC || 4–5 (11) || Donnie Sellers (4–1) || Scott Tully (3–3) || || 608 || 28–15 || 12–12
|- align="center" bgcolor=#ffbbbb
| April 28 ||  ||  || Frank Eck Stadium • Notre Dame, IN || 6–9 (12) || Walter Borkovich (2–0) || Evy Ruibal (0–3) || || 414 || 28–16 || 
|- align="center" bgcolor=#bbffbb
| April 29 ||  ||  || Frank Eck Stadium • Notre Dame, IN || 2–0 || Nick McCarty (6–3) || Jared Paderez (1–1) || || 441 || 29–16 ||
|-

|- align="center" bgcolor=#bbffbb
| May 1 ||  ||  || Frank Eck Stadium • Notre Dame, IN || 4–1 || Scott Kerrigan (3–4) || Adam Oller (6–3) || Brad Bass (2) || 416 || 30–16 ||
|- align="center" bgcolor=#ffbbbb
| May 2 || Northwestern State ||  || Frank Eck Stadium • Notre Dame, IN || 2–8 || Josh Oller (8–1) || Brandon Bielak (4–2) || || 617 || 30–17 || 
|- align="center" bgcolor=#ffbbbb
| May 3 || Northwestern State ||  || Frank Eck Stadium • Notre Dame, IN || 4–8 || Jeffrey Stovall (5–4) || Scott Tully (3–4) || Brandon Smith (8) || 579 || 30–18 || 
|- align="center" bgcolor=#bbffbb
| May 9 || No. 24  || || Frank Eck Stadium • Notre Dame, IN || 10–5 || Scott Tully (4–4) || Trevor Kelley (5–2) || || 1,064 || 31–18 || 13–12
|- align="center" bgcolor=#bbffbb
| May 9 || No. 24 North Carolina ||  || Frank Eck Stadium • Notre Dame, IN || 3–1 || Ryan Smoyer (7–0) || J. B. Bukauskas (4–2) || || 1,064 || 32–18 || 14–12
|- align="center" bgcolor=#bbffbb
| May 10 || No. 24 North Carolina ||  || Frank Eck Stadium • Notre Dame, IN || 8–7 || Brad Bass (3–0) || Trent Thornton (3–5) || || 406 || 33–18 || 15–12
|- align="center" bgcolor=#bbffbb
| May 14 || at Boston College || No. 24 || Pellagrini Diamond • Chestnut Hill, MA || 10–4 || Brandon Bielak (5–2) || Mike King (1–5) || || 604 || 34–18 || 16–12
|- align="center" bgcolor=#bbffbb
| May 15 || at Boston College || No. 24 || Pellagrini Diamond • Chestnut Hill, MA || 5–2 || Ryan Smoyer (8–0) || Justin Dunn (4–4) || Sean Guenther (5) || 412 || 35–18 || 17–12
|- align="center" bgcolor=#ffbbbb
| May 15 || at Boston College || No. 24 || Pellagrini Diamond • Chestnut Hill, MA || 5–6 (10) || Nick Poore (3–3) || Sean Guenther (1–3) || || 202 || 35–19 || 17–13
|-

|-
! style="" | Post-Season
|-

|- align="center" bgcolor=#ffbbbb
| May 21 || vs. NC State || No. 20 || Durham Bulls Athletic Park • Durham, NC || 0–3 || Brian Brown (7–3) || Scott Kerrigan (3–5) || Curt Britt (2) || 3,599 || 35–20 || 0–1
|- align="center" bgcolor=#bbffbb
| May 22 || vs. No. 29 Virginia || No. 20 || Durham Bulls Athletic Park • Durham, NC || 8–2 || Ryan Smoyer (9–0) || Brandon Waddell (3–5) || Brandon Bielak (1) || 2,916 || 36–20 || 1–1
|- align="center" bgcolor=#ffbbbb
| May 23 || vs. No. 6 Miami (FL) || No. 20 || Durham Bulls Athletic Park • Durham, NC || 5–6 || Cooper Hammond (5–1) || Brad Bass (3–1) || || 4,249 || 36–21 || 1–2
|-

|- align="center" bgcolor=#bbffbb
| May 29 || vs.  || No. 23 || Illinois Field • Champaign, IL || 13–7 || Brandon Bielak (6–2) || Trevor Swaney (4–3) || || 1,454 || 37–21 || 1–0
|- align="center" bgcolor=#ffbbbb
| May 31 || at No. 3  || No. 23 || Illinois Field • Champaign, IL || 0–3 || Drasen Johnson (10–3) || Ryan Smoyer (9–1) || || 3,002 || 37–22 || 1–1
|- align="center" bgcolor=#ffbbbb
| May 31 || vs. Wright State || No. 23 || Illinois Field • Champaign, IL || 0–4 || Jack Van Horn (4–2) || Brandon Bielak (6–3) || || 1,292 || 37–23 || 1–2
|-

|-
| style="font-size:88%"| All rankings from Collegiate Baseball.

2015 MLB Draft
The following Notre Dame players were drafted in the 2015 Major League Baseball Draft.

Ranking Movements

References

Notre Dame Fighting Irish
Notre Dame Fighting Irish baseball seasons
Notre Dame
Notre Dame Fighting Irish